The Kenya Medical Supplies Agency (KEMSA) is a specialized Government medical logistics provider for Ministries of Medical Services/Public Health-supported health facilities and programmes in Kenya. KEMSA was established as a state corporation under Cap 446,through the Kenya Medical Supplies Agency Order 2000(Legal Notice No.17 of 11 February 2000).
It plays the role of procuring, storing and distributing health commodities for the public sector.

The strengthening of KEMSA has been identified as a key project of Kenya's Vision 2030

Role in health care
 Developing and operating a viable commercial service for the procurement and sale of drugs and other medical supplies
 Providing a secure source of drugs and other medical supplies for public health institutions
 Advising the Health Management Boards and the general public on matters related to the procurement, cost effectiveness and rational use of drugs and other medical supplies.

See also
Healthcare in Kenya

References

Medical and health organisations based in Kenya
Government agencies of Kenya
Government-owned companies of Kenya